Darvishan-e Yek (also Romanized as Darvīshān-e Yek; also known as Darvīshā and Darvīshān-e ‘Arīyeẕ) is a village in Howmeh-ye Sharqi Rural District, in the Central District of Ramhormoz County, Khuzestan Province, Iran. At the 2006 census, its population was 51, in 11 families.

References 

Populated places in Ramhormoz County